Squaw root (also spelled Squawroot or Squaw-root) is a common name which can refer to a number of different herbs native to North America:
Actaea racemosa
Caulophyllum thalictroides
Conopholis americana
Perideridia gairdneri